William Joseph Moriarty (August 1883 – December 25, 1916) was a Major League Baseball player. He played shortstop in six games for the 1909 Cincinnati Reds. His brother, George Moriarty was also a professional baseball player.

External links
Baseball Reference

1883 births
1916 deaths
Cincinnati Reds players
Baseball players from Illinois
Major League Baseball shortstops
Sioux City Cornhuskers players
Freeport Pretzels players
San Francisco Seals (baseball) players
Stockton Millers players
Columbus Senators players
Omaha Rourkes players
Louisville Colonels (minor league) players
Trenton Tigers players
Chicago Keeleys players